ESPN Caribbean is the local division of ESPN Inc., that broadcasts in most Caribbean countries (in English). Operated as part of the ESPN International division, the service is composed of ESPN and ESPN2; both were launched in 2007.

Programming

As with its American parent, ESPN offers a selection of events in the world of sport, while also providing a Caribbean focus on sporting events popular in that region. ESPN's Caribbean networks air in 32 countries and territories. Key programming includes America's Cup Yachting, ICC World T20, ICC World Cup and Caribbean Super 50, La Liga, Italian Serie A, Golf Majors, NFL, NBA, MLB and Grand Slam tennis, as well as popular regionalized studio shows like ESPNFC.

ESPN Caribbean also produces a regional version of ESPN.com, which provide sports news and programming information to Caribbean viewers.

ESPN Caribbean also programs ESPN Play, a specialized broadband network which broadcasts thousands of live games and events online each year. Content features enhanced coverage of events seen on ESPN and ESPN2, as well as some events exclusive to ESPN Play. In addition, ESPN Play also offers an archive of local content including ESPN events and original studio news shows. The service is available through participating service providers as part of the programming tier where ESPN's networks are available, at no additional cost. Sports featured on ESPN Play include Caribbean Regional Super50, ICC World Cup, ICC World T20, MLB, NBA, tennis, golf, among others.

ESPN Radio 

ESPN Caribbean is also the regional distributor of ESPN Radio, which is currently heard over two stations: ZSR-FM (103.5) in Nassau, Bahamas (owned by Navetter Broadcasting Company); and KLAS ESPN Sports 89 FM in Jamaica (KLAS Sports Radio Ltd.). ESPN secured agreements with ZSR-FM in 2011 and KLAS in 2013.

Sport Events 
Some of the major events seen on ESPN and ESPN2 include:

Football
 UEFA Women's Championship
 Women's Super League
 La Liga
 Serie A
 Women's Serie A
 Ligue 1   
 Eredivisie 
 Belgian First Division A
 Scottish Premiership
 Süper Lig
 FA Cup
 Women's FA Cup
 EFL Cup
 FA Community Shield
 FA Youth Cup
 Coppa Italia
 Coppa Italia (women)
 Supercoppa Italiana
 Supercoppa Italiana (women)
 DFB-Pokal
 Trophée des Champions
 Taça de Portugal
 Taça da Liga
 Supertaça Cândido de Oliveira
 Belgian Cup
 Belgian Super Cup
 Scottish Cup
 Scottish League Cup
 UEFA European Under-21 Championship
 UEFA European Under-19 Championship
 UEFA European Under-17 Championship 
 UEFA Women's Under-19 Championship
 UEFA Women's Under-17 Championship
 UEFA Futsal Championship
 UEFA Futsal Champions League
 UEFA Women's Futsal Championship
 UEFA Under-19 Futsal Championship
 Copa Libertadores
 Copa Sudamericana
 Recopa Sudamericana
 Africa Cup of Nations
 FIFA World Cup qualification (CAF)
 WAFU Nations Cup
 CAF Champions League
 CONCACAF W Championship
 CONCACAF Champions League
 CONCACAF League
 CONCACAF Under-20 Championship 
 CONCACAF Under-17 Championship 
 USL Championship
 USL League One
 Leagues Cup
 Campeones Cup
 Argentine Primera División
 AFC Women's Asian Cup
 FIFA World Cup qualification (AFC)
 AFC Champions League
 AFC Cup
 AFC U-23 Asian Cup
 AFC U-20 Asian Cup
 AFC Futsal Asian Cup
 Toulon Tournament
 International Champions Cup

Tennis
 Australian Open
 Roland Garros
 Wimbledon
 U.S. Open
 ATP Finals
 ATP Tour Masters 1000
 ATP Tour 500
 ATP Tour 250 
 Next Generation ATP Finals
 Laver Cup
 World Tennis Championship

Badminton 
 BWF World Tour

Basketball
 NBA
 WNBA
 FIBA Intercontinental Cup
 Basketball Africa League
 Women's National Basketball League
 NCAA basketball
 NBA Summer League
 NBA G League
 The Basketball Tournament

Baseball
 Major League Baseball
 Little League World Series
 College baseball

College Sports
 National Collegiate Athletic Association events

Cricket
 Cricket World Cup
 ICC World Cup Qualifier
 ICC World Twenty20
 ICC T20 World Cup Qualifier
 ICC Under-19 Cricket World Cup
 Regional Super50
 The Hundred
 West Indies cricket team
 England cricket team
 England women's cricket team

Cycling
 Tour de France
 Tour de France Femmes
 Vuelta a España
 Tour Down Under
 Paris–Nice
 Critérium du Dauphiné
 Paris–Roubaix
 Liège–Bastogne–Liège
 Omloop Het Nieuwsblad
 Gent–Wevelgem 
 Dwars door Vlaanderen
 Amstel Gold Race
 La Flèche Wallonne
 Scheldeprijs
 Brabantse Pijl
 Paris–Tours
 UCI BMX World Championships

Extreme Sports
 X Games

Golf
 The Masters
 PGA Championship
 U.S. Open
 The Open Championship
 PGA Tour
 PGA European Tour
 World Golf Championships
 President's Cup
 Ryder Cup
 U.S. Women's Open 
 U.S. Senior Open and U.S. Senior Women's Open 
 Women's British Open
 Senior Open
 Senior PGA Championship
 Augusta National Women's Amateur
 U.S. Women's Amateur
 Latin America Amateur Championship
 Asia-Pacific Amateur Championship
 Women's Asia-Pacific Amateur Championship

Gridiron Football
 National Football League
 College Football
 XFL

Handball
 European Men's Handball Championship
 European Women's Handball Championship

Horse Racing
 Kentucky Derby
 Preakness Stakes
 Belmont Stakes
 Pegasus World Cup
 Saudi Cup
 Dubai World Cup
 Grand National
 Epsom Derby
 Royal Ascot
 Irish Derby
 King George VI and Queen Elizabeth Stakes
 Haskell Stakes
 Sussex Stakes
 International Stakes
 Irish Champion Stakes
 British Champions Day
 Breeders' Cup
 Melbourne Cup
 Bahrain International

Ice Hockey
 NHL
 Swedish Hockey League

Marathon
 Tokyo Marathon
 New York City Marathon
 Valencia Marathon

Mixed Martial Arts 
 UFC

Motor Sports
 Formula One
 FIA Formula 2 Championship 
 FIA Formula 3 Championship
 MotoGP  
 Moto2 
 Moto3 
 MotoE World Cup
 W Series
 Dakar Rally
 World Rally Championship
 Porsche Supercup
 Superbike World Championship
 AMA Supersport Championship

Multi-sport events
 Pan American Games
 Parapan American Games
 Special Olympics World Games
 Universiade
 Aurora Games

Rugby
 Rugby World Cup
 Women's Rugby World Cup
 Six Nations Championship
 The Rugby Championship 
 Super Rugby
 Premiership Rugby
 Super Rugby Americas
 Americas Rugby Trophy
 National Provincial Championship
 Women's Six Nations Championship
 Super Rugby Aupiki
 Farah Palmer Cup
 Six Nations Under 20s Championship
 Test matches

Skiing
 FIS Alpine World Ski Championships
 FIS Alpine Ski World Cup
 FIS Cross-Country World Cup
 FIS Freestyle Ski World Cup
 FIS Nordic Combined World Cup
 FIS Ski Jumping World Cup
 FIS Snowboard World Cup

Table Tennis 
 World Table Tennis Championships
 World Table Tennis (ITTF)
 Asian Cup Table Tennis Tournament
 ITTF World Youth Championships

Volleyball
 FIVB Volleyball Women's World Championship
 FIVB Volleyball Men's World Championship
 FIVB Volleyball Women's Nations League
 FIVB Volleyball Men's Nations League
 CEV Women's Champions League
 CEV Champions League
 FIVB Volleyball Women's Club World Championship
 FIVB Volleyball Men's Club World Championship
 Italian Volleyball League
 FIVB Beach Volleyball World Championships
 Beach Pro Tour

Water Sports 
 FINA World Aquatics Championships
 FINA World Junior Swimming Championships
 FINA Diving World Cup

Weightlifting
 World Weightlifting Championships

Yachting 
 America's Cup
 America's Cup Qualifiers and Challenger Playoffs
 America's Cup World Series

References

External links
 

ESPN Latin America
Caribbean
Sports television networks

The Walt Disney Company Latin America